Cyclolobium brasiliense (Brazil: louveira, cabruitinga, mucitaíba; Paraguay: ysypó copi) is a species of flowering plants in the legume family, Fabaceae. It belongs to the subfamily Faboideae. It is native to Bolivia, Brazil, and Paraguay and is the only member of the genus Cyclolobium.

References

Brongniartieae
Monotypic Fabaceae genera